Dominick Lukasz Zator (born September 18, 1994) is a Canadian professional soccer player who plays as a defender for Ekstraklasa club Korona Kielce.

Club career

Early career
Zator played for five seasons with the University of Calgary from 2012 to 2016. While at university, Zator also appeared for USL PDL side Calgary Foothills FC in 2015 and 2016, during which time the club progressed to the 2016 PDL Championship.

Whitecaps FC 2
Zator signed his first professional contract with Whitecaps FC 2 of the United Soccer League on March 21, 2017. Upon signing, Zator was described as "a modern day centre back with exceptional pace and athleticism" by Calgary Foothills coach Tommy Wheeldon Jr. In April 2017, Zator made his professional debut for Whitecaps FC 2 in a 3–0 win over Portland Timbers 2. He would spend one season with Whitecaps FC 2 before the club ceased operations after the 2017 season. Zator would not be signed to a USL deal with the Whitecaps new affiliate, Fresno FC.

Calgary Foothills
Zator would return to Calgary Foothills for the 2018 PDL season. He and the club won the PDL Championship that season, defeating Reading United in the final, with Zator scoring a goal in the game.

Cavalry FC
Zator signed for Cavalry FC on December 12, 2018. Zator played a key role for Cavalry as they won the spring season of the 2019 Canadian Premier League. Cavalry also found success in the Canadian Championship, defeating fellow Canadian Premier League sides Pacific FC and Forge FC in the first two rounds. Cavalry drew Vancouver Whitecaps FC of Major League Soccer in the third round and they battled to a 0–0 draw in Calgary in the first leg. In the second leg, in Vancouver, Zator scored the winning goal in a 2–1 victory, helping Cavalry become the first Canadian Premier League team to defeat an MLS team and booking a ticket to the semifinals against the Montreal Impact in the process. Zator made 27 league appearances that season, scoring one goal, and also appeared in both legs of the Canadian Premier League Finals.

After a standout season, and training stints with RCD Mallorca and Ross County in the offseason, Zator extended his contract with Cavalry through 2020 on November 28, 2019. He appeared in all ten matches of the shortened 2020 season for Cavalry, scoring one goal. On January 26, 2021, the club announced that Zator had declined a contract extension in order to explore free agency.

York United
On February 1, 2021, Zator signed a two-year contract with York United. The following day, he was sent on a short-term loan to newly-promoted Swedish Superettan side Vasalunds IF. On June 1 he was recalled from his loan, amassing five appearances during his time in Sweden.

Korona Kielce
On 14 December 2022, Zator joined Ekstraklasa club Korona Kielce on a contract through June 2024.

International career
Born in Canada, Zator is of Polish descent. In November 2019, Zator was named to Canada's 23-man squad for a CONCACAF Nations League match against the United States.

In March 2023 Zator was re-called to Canada ahead of two CONCACAF Nations League fixutres against Honduras and Curaçao.

Honours
Calgary Foothills
PDL Championship: 2018

Cavalry FC
Canadian Premier League (Regular season): 
Champions: Spring 2019, Fall 2019
 Canadian Premier League Finals
Runners-up: 2019

References

External links

 
 

1994 births
Living people
Association football defenders
Canadian soccer players
Soccer players from Calgary
Canadian people of Polish descent
Calgary Dinos soccer players
Calgary Foothills FC players
Whitecaps FC 2 players
Cavalry FC players
York United FC players
Vasalunds IF players
Korona Kielce players
USL League Two players
USL Championship players
Canadian Premier League players
Ekstraklasa players
Canadian expatriate soccer players
Expatriate footballers in Sweden
Canadian expatriate sportspeople in Sweden
Expatriate footballers in Poland
Canadian expatriate sportspeople in Poland